Black Earth Rettenmund Prairie is a Wisconsin Department of Natural Resources-designated State Natural Area featuring one of the few remaining dry-mesic prairies in Wisconsin, situated on a low Driftless Area knob and ridge. Despite the prairie's relatively small size, 130 native prairie plant species have been documented on the site. Many of these species are quite showy, including wood lily, shooting star, fringed puccoon, pasque flower, butterfly weed, and compass plant. Several rare species are also found on the site, including pomme-de-prairie, white camas, striped hairstreak, and the state-threatened species rough-stemmed false foxglove (Agalinis gattingeri) and regal fritillary.

The original land-surveyor records for the area indicate presettlement vegetation was treeless prairie. Following settlement in the area, the prairie escaped plowing, although some grazing undoubtedly occurred, and old tractor furrows can still be seen along the top of the ridge. The most recent private owners preserved the prairie for over 40 years. The gradual decline of the prairie over this time, as well as the owners' desire to preserve it, led to the Nature Conservancy's purchase of the prairie in 1986, below market value. Restoration of the prairie soon commenced, and in 2003, management was taken over by the Prairie Enthusiasts, an organization dedicated to preserving and restoring native prairie remnants. Full ownership of the site was transferred to the Prairie Enthusiasts in 2007.

Location and access 

References

External links 
Black Earth Rettenmund Prairie
Plant Species List
Trail Map
Google Map of Black Earth Rettenmund Prairie

Protected areas established in 1986
Protected areas of Dane County, Wisconsin
State Natural Areas of Wisconsin
1986 establishments in Wisconsin